André Silva (born March 22, 1988) is a Brazilian rugby sevens player. He was named in 's sevens squad for the 2016 Summer Olympics. He also played at the 2015 Pan American Games for Brazil.

References

External links 
 

Male rugby sevens players
Brazilian rugby union players
Olympic rugby sevens players of Brazil
Brazil international rugby sevens players
Rugby sevens players at the 2016 Summer Olympics
1988 births
Living people
Rugby sevens players at the 2015 Pan American Games
Pan American Games competitors for Brazil
Brazilian rugby sevens players